Ryan McDuff is a former American soccer player who played college soccer for Brown University. In 2012, McDuff won the men's soccer Senior CLASS Award, a national award which recognizes the best senior student athletic in men's college soccer.

Career

Youth and college 
McDuff played high school soccer for Plano Senior High School from 2006 until 2009, and was a starter on the varsity team his sophomore through senior years. While with the Plano Warriors boys' soccer program, he helped the team win the Texas 5-A State Boys' Soccer Championship. McDuff was named his senior year to the ESPN Rise Third Team All-American, and also earned state, regional, and district accolades. During high school, McDuff played club soccer for Andromeda FC, where he helped the '91 team win the US Youth Soccer Association (USYSA) U-17 National Championship, the USYSA Regional Championship, UMBRO International Cup Championship in Manchester, England, three North Texas State Cup Finals, a Dallas Cup Final, and a Disney Soccer Showcase Final.

In early 2009, McDuff committed to play college soccer for Brown University. During his freshman year, McDuff started 14 matches and made 17 total appearances. During his sophomore year, he became a regular starter for the Bears, and became captain of the team his junior year. During his third year with Brown, McDuff earned Defensive MVP and the All-Tournament team for the 2011 Brown Soccer Classic.

During his senior year, he was nominated for the Senior CLASS award, winning the 2012 honor.

Personal life 
After graduating from Brown University, McDuff sought a non-soccer career, working at EY-Parthenon in Boston as a consultant since he graduated from Brown.

References

External links 
 Ryan McDuff at Brown University Athletics
 

1990 births
Living people
American soccer players
Association football defenders
Businesspeople from Texas
Brown Bears men's soccer players
Sportspeople from Plano, Texas
Soccer players from Texas